Sawyer International Airport  is a county-owned public-use airport in Marquette County, Michigan, United States. It is included in the Federal Aviation Administration (FAA) National Plan of Integrated Airport Systems for 2021–2025, in which it is categorized as a non-hub primary commercial service facility.

This commercial and general aviation airport is located near Gwinn, on a portion of the former K. I. Sawyer Air Force Base, which closed in September 1995. The airport opened for passenger service in September 1999, serving Marquette and the surrounding area. It replaced the former Marquette County Airport , which closed the same year.

Although many U.S. airports use the same three-letter location identifier for the Federal Aviation Administration (FAA) and International Air Transport Association (IATA), this airport is assigned SAW by the FAA and MQT by the IATA (which assigned SAW to Sabiha Gökçen International Airport in Istanbul, Turkey). The airport's International Civil Aviation Organization (ICAO) identifier is KSAW.

The airport received $18 million from the US Department of Transportation in 2020 as part of the CARES Act to help mitigate the effects of the covid-19 pandemic.

In 2022, the airport sent out a survey to ask for input in a rebranding effort.

Facilities and aircraft

Aircraft Statistics
It has a single asphalt/concrete runway, originally re-designed in 1959 to accommodate B-52 bombers and KC-135 tankers. This airport is capable of handling aircraft as large as a Boeing 747-8 or a 777-200.

For the 12-month period ending December 31, 2021, the airport had 18,141 aircraft operations, an average of 50 per day: 54% general aviation, 38% air taxi, 1% scheduled commercial service and 7% military.   In December 2022, there were 41 aircraft based at this airport: 36 single-engine, 4 multi-engine and 1 jet.

Facilities

The airport is home to the Marquette County Aviation Wall of Honor, which features many influential pilots and engineers.

In 2022, the airport received a $2.7 million grant from the U.S. Department of Transportation to repair hangars.

Upgrade Plans
The airline is planning on starting a significant renovation in 2023. $20 million will be allocated toward the project. Included in the project is a new fire suppression system in a military aircraft hangar, a terminal expansion, and new taxiway asphalt. The air traffic control tower will be upgraded in 2024, and new aircraft parking spaces will be added. The entire project could last until 2027. The project will also include security upgrades to be able to accept flights on bigger aircraft.

Terminal upgrades will include an upgraded entrance, new art installations, new expansions, and a bigger size in general. The FAA will fund part of the project, including money from the federal CARES Act from the Covid-19 pandemic. The airport is collecting final funds in order to begin the project.

The airport has already added new hangars to support airline operations at the airport.

A number of unusable buildings will be torn down as part of the project.

Airlines and destinations

Passenger

Statistics

Cargo

Accidents & Incidents
On January 5, 2015, a Cessna 172 Skyhawk veered off the runway at Sawyer while attempting a takeoff. The plane was substantially damaged, but the pilot was uninjured.
On September 3, 2019, a small plane impacted trees while attempting an emergency landing near Sawyer. After an engine failure, the aircraft overshot a field it was aiming for and landed on a nearby road before veering into trees. The aircraft was towed to a hangar at the airport for investigation. The pilot and his son were uninjured.

References

External links
 
 Sawyer International Airport at Michigan Airport Directory
 
 

 Photos of the closed Marquette County Airport

Airports in Michigan
Airports established in 1999
1999 establishments in Michigan
Buildings and structures in Marquette County, Michigan
Transportation in Marquette County, Michigan
Airports in the Upper Peninsula of Michigan